"Your Number" is a song by Nigerian singer Ayo Jay, first released on June 21, 2013 by One Nation and re-released on November 11, 2015 by RCA Records. The song was produced by British record producer Melvitto. According to Raro Lae, "Your Number" is the first  ever Nigerian song to sit on any Billboard chart without any features. On February 28, 2017, "Your Number" was certified gold by the Recording Industry Association of America (RIAA).

Music video
On October 7, 2013, a music video for this song was released by One Nation. On August 31, 2016, RCA Records re-released music video to Your Number with 28.9 million views on YouTube.

Accolades

Charts

Certifications

Release history

Your Number (Remix)

Your Number (Remix) is a song by Nigerian singer Ayo Jay, featuring Fetty Wap. The remix was released on July 21, 2015 by One Nation. On August 23, 2016, RCA Records re-released another remix, featuring Chris Brown and Kid Ink.

Release history

References

2013 singles
2015 singles
2016 singles
2013 songs
RCA Records singles